The Bears and I is a 1974 American drama film directed by Bernard McEveety and written by John Whedon. The film stars Patrick Wayne, Chief Dan George, Andrew Duggan, Michael Ansara and Robert Pine. The film was released on July 31, 1974, by Buena Vista Distribution.

Plot
Robert (Bob) Leslie, a Vietnam veteran goes to the remote homeland of a fallen comrade to deliver his personal effects to his father, a First Nations chief and shaman. He is taken with the beauty of the west and decides to stay a while to find himself.

Bob finds three orphaned cubs and begins to raise them, with the intent of teaching them to be independent. However, in the process he grows attached to them, causing him to waver in his determination to release them back into the wild.

Meanwhile, the indigenous population faces eviction by the federal government, which wants to build facilities in the part of the national park where they reside. Bob tries several times to speak to the park board on their behalf, but his ignorance of Native history leads to conflict between him and his friend's people. Some register evident frustration, while others resist the authorities' intent with threats of violence. As the tension escalates, one man turns his anger towards Bob and attacks his home and the bears, leading to a forest fire that endangers the park and its inhabitants, human and animal.

As he comes to understand the wisdom of his friend's father and the danger the bears face, Bob realizes he must push the bears away.

Cast
Patrick Wayne as Bob Leslie
Chief Dan George as Chief Peter A-Tas-Ka-Nay
Andrew Duggan as Commissioner Gaines
Michael Ansara as Oliver Red Fern
Robert Pine as John McCarten
Valentin de Vargas as Sam Eagle Speaker 
Hal Baylor as Foreman

See also
 List of American films of 1974

References

External links

 
 

1974 films
Walt Disney Pictures films
American drama films
1974 drama films
Films scored by Buddy Baker (composer)
Films about bears
Films directed by Bernard McEveety Jr.
Films produced by Winston Hibler
1970s English-language films
1970s American films